Wang Jeung-hun or Wang Jung-hoon (born 7 September 1995) is a South Korean professional golfer. He plays on the European and Asian Tours. He is from Seoul, South Korea.

In 2016, he won the European Tour's Trophée Hassan II on a sponsor exemption. He made a birdie on the second extra hole of a sudden-death playoff to defeat Nacho Elvira. The following week, he won again at the AfrAsia Bank Mauritius Open, a co-sanctioned event on the European, Sunshine and Asian Tours. He claimed a one stroke victory over Siddikur Rahman. His third European Tour win came at the 2017 Commercial Bank Qatar Masters where he beat Joakim Lagergren and Jaco van Zyl in a playoff.

Prior to the European and Asian Tours, he played on PGA Tour China and won the tour's first event in 2014.

Amateur wins
2010 Carlubang Amateur Open, YoungIn Univ. President Cup, Sports Chosun Cup
2011 DHL-WWW Philippine Amateur, Philippine Amateur

Professional wins (4)

European Tour wins (3)

1Co-sanctioned by the Asian Tour and the Sunshine Tour

European Tour playoff record (2–0)

Asian Tour wins (1)

1Co-sanctioned by the European Tour and the Sunshine Tour

PGA Tour China wins (1)

Results in major championships

CUT = missed the half-way cut
"T" = tied

Results in World Golf Championships

QF, R16, R32, R64 = Round in which player lost in match play
"T" = Tied

Team appearances
Professional
EurAsia Cup (representing Asia): 2016

References

External links

South Korean male golfers
Asian Tour golfers
European Tour golfers
Olympic golfers of South Korea
Golfers at the 2016 Summer Olympics
Golfers from Seoul
1995 births
Living people